Wail of the Banshee is a seven-part children's fantasy drama series from 1992 broadcast on CITV, and made by Central Television.

Plot
The Banshee of myth is based, as most legends are, on real events. Centuries ago, an alien race known as the Lamia arrived on Earth. Amoral scientists, they viewed humanity as nothing more than experimental subjects. The literal translation of their name for humans is lab rats.

They were named Banshee because of the sound their spacecraft made. Hence the name Baaan-sheee.

The Lamia has a defensive/attack ability which involves them emitting ultra-high-frequency sound from their throats, a wail which disorients and pains any humans who hear it, allowing the victims to be taken on board the ships for experimentation without resistance. It is for this reason that the 'wail of the Banshee' was associated with death, as whenever it was heard, death followed for someone nearby.

Cast
Susie Blake - Fay Morgan (Morgan le Fay)
Michael Angelis - Merlin
Edward Hardman - Jason
Greg Chisholm - Matt
Debbie Doolin - Diz
Ellen-Gayle Harewood - Jubilee
David Barber - Boggart
Alan Corduner - Death

1992 British television series debuts
1992 British television series endings
1990s British children's television series
British children's fantasy television series
British children's science fiction television series
ITV children's television shows
Television series by ITV Studios
English-language television shows
Television shows produced by Central Independent Television
Banshees

External links